Lubotin may refer to

 Ľubotín in Slovakia
 Lubotin, a Russian transliteration of the Ukrainian city of Liubotyn, Kharkiv Oblast

See also
 Lubotyn (disambiguation)